Kanubhai Mohanlal Desai is an Indian politician associated with Bharatiya Janata Party. He is a member of Gujarat Legislative Assembly representing Pardi constituency. He is the current Minister of Finance, Minister of Energy, Government of Gujarat since 16 September 2021.

References 

Indian politicians
Bharatiya Janata Party of Gujarat
People from Valsad district
1951 births
Living people